Truly Yours 2 is the second extended play by American hip hop artist J. Cole. It was released digitally for free download and stream on April 30, 2013. The EP features guest appearances from Young Jeezy, 2 Chainz and Bas. Production came from J. Cole, Canei Finch, Jake One, and Ron Gilmore. The EP has been downloaded over 500,000 times on mixtape site DatPiff.

Background
The series consists of songs that Cole knew would not make the cutlist for his second studio album Born Sinner. The free EP was released as a trilogy, with the third being released as the deluxe edition of Born Sinner.

Critical reception
Writing for HipHopDX, Omar Burgess praised Truly Yours 2 saying, "Born Sinner will be the ultimate test of Cole’s desire to grow and experiment as he pointed out in the letter that accompanied Truly Yours. This short set indicates he’s taking steps in the right direction, and his next full-length effort will hopefully appease his old and newer fans." Burgess also praised Truly Yours 2 saying, "both casual fans and Cole stans alike can package these six songs with the first Truly Yours and have something that competes with a lot of albums in the marketplace."

Track listing

 Notes
 "Cousins" was also featured on Bas' mixtape, "Quarter Water Raised Me Vol. II".

 Sample credits
 "Cole Summer" interpolates "Juicy" by The Notorious B.I.G. and samples "Nothing Even Matters" by Lauryn Hill. 
 "Kenny Lofton" samples "Hurt" by The Manhattans. 
 "Chris Tucker" interpolates "Niggas in Paris" by Jay Z and  Kanye West.
 "Head Bussa" samples "Interlude4U" by Trey Songz.

References

J. Cole albums
2013 EPs
Albums produced by J. Cole
Dreamville Records albums
Sequel albums
Albums free for download by copyright owner